Derek Bloom (born January 30, 1983 in South Pasadena, California) is an American musician and singer, known for drumming in post-hardcore band From First to Last for all of their time as a band until their revival. He left From First to Last in November 2013, later rejoining in 2017. He is also the drummer for his grindcore side-project with Travis Richter, known as The Color of Violence.

Musical career

From First to Last (2002–2010, 2017-Present) 
Bloom was the second drummer, although technically the first official drummer of post-hardcore band From First to Last. He was featured in every release by the band, up until their indefinite hiatus, which was announced on July 28, 2010. Lead vocalist Matt Good release this statement about the hiatus:

The Color of Violence (2002–2003, 2006–present) 
Bloom formed grindcore band The Color of Violence with future members of From First to Last, including current guitarist and vocalist Matt Good, as well as former bassist Joe Antillion and former guitarist Travis Richter, as well as Richter's friend Chad Crews on guitar. The band started out full-time from 2002 to 2003, but all of the members, except for Crews, decided to focus on From First to Last. But in 2006, Richter and Bloom decided to remake the project as a two-man duo, with Richter. The two released their debut full-length album, Youthanize, on April 7, 2009. The band said that "[Youthanize] may not be groundbreaking, and it may not sell any copies, but we tried to be ourselves and experiment, and we're all really happy with the way it turned out, so fuck it." The album did not chart on any of Billboards music charts.

Discography 
with From First to Last
Aesthetic (Four Leaf Recordings, 2003)
Dear Diary, My Teen Angst Has a Body Count (Epitaph Records, 2004)
Heroine (Epitaph Records, 2006)
From First to Last (Suretone/Interscope Records, 2008)
Throne to the Wolves (Rise Records, 2010)

with The Color of Violence
Youthanize (Epitaph Records, 2009)

Videography 
with From First to Last

"Such a Tragedy"
"Ride the Wings of Pestilence"
"Note to Self"
"The Latest Plague"
"Shame Shame"
"Worlds Away"

References 

1983 births
American rock drummers
Living people
People from South Pasadena, California
Musicians from California
21st-century American drummers
From First to Last members
The Color of Violence members